The Hokuriku Collegiate American Football League (北陸学生アメリカンフットボール連盟) is an American college football league made up of colleges and universities in the Hokuriku region of Japan. The winner of the Hokuriku league participates in the post season on the West Japan side of the bracket.

History
In 1973, the "Kinki" block of the Kansai Collegiate American Football League was founded with the University of Fukui and the Kanazawa Institute of Technology as members. In 1982, Fukui and KIT split from the Kansai League to form the Hokuriku League.

Member schools

Year-by-Year Standings

References

External links 
  (Japanese)

 
American football in Japan
American football leagues
College athletics conferences in Japan